North Buffalo Suburban Airport  is a privately owned, public use airport located three nautical miles (6 km) south of the central business district of Lockport, a city in Niagara County, New York, United States.

Facilities and aircraft 
For the 12-month period ending June 19, 2007, the airport had 3,600 general aviation aircraft operations, an average of 9 per day. There are 31 aircraft based at this airport: 97% single-engine and 3% multi-engine.

Nearby airports 
Nearby airports with instrument approach procedures include:
 BUF – Buffalo Niagara International Airport (10 nm S)
 IAG – Niagara Falls International Airport (11 nm W)
 9G3 – Akron Airport (11 nm SE)
 9G0 – Buffalo Airfield (14 nm S)
 9G6 – Pine Hill Airport (19 nm E)

References

External links 
 North Buffalo Suburban Airport (0G0) at NYSDOT Airport Directory
 
 

Airports in New York (state)
Transportation buildings and structures in Niagara County, New York